The Angarium (Latin; from Greek  ) was the institution of the royal mounted couriers in ancient Persia. The messengers, called , alternated in stations that had a day's ride distance along the Royal Road. The riders were exclusively in the service of the Great King and the network allowed for messages to be transported from Susa to Sardis (2699 km) in nine days; the journey took ninety days on foot. 

Herodotus, in about 440 BC, describes the Persian messenger system which had been perfected by Darius I about half a century earlier:
Now there is nothing mortal which accomplishes a journey with more speed than these messengers, so skillfully has this been invented by the Persians: for they say that according to the number of days of which the entire journey consists, so many horses and men are set at intervals, each man and horse appointed for a day's journey. These neither snow nor rain nor heat nor darkness of night prevents from accomplishing each one the task proposed to him, with the very utmost speed. The first then rides and delivers the message with which he is charged to the second, and the second to the third; and after that it goes through them handed from one to the other, as in the torch-race among the Hellenes, which they perform for Hephaestus. This kind of running of their horses the Persians call Angarium.

See also
Chapar Khaneh
Angarum

References

Further reading 

Postal systems
Achaemenid Empire
Darius the Great